The arrondissement of Charleville-Mézières is an arrondissement of France in the Ardennes department in the Grand Est region. It has 157 communes.

Composition

The communes of the arrondissement of Charleville-Mézières, and their INSEE codes, are:

 Aiglemont (08003)
 Anchamps (08011)
 Antheny (08015)
 Aouste (08016)
 Arreux (08022)
 Aubigny-les-Pothées (08026)
 Aubrives (08028)
 Auge (08030)
 Auvillers-les-Forges (08037)
 Les Ayvelles (08040)
 Baâlons (08041)
 Barbaise (08047)
 Belval (08058)
 Blanchefosse-et-Bay (08069)
 Blombay (08071)
 Bogny-sur-Meuse (08081)
 Bossus-lès-Rumigny (08073)
 Boulzicourt (08076)
 Bourg-Fidèle (08078)
 Bouvellemont (08080)
 Brognon (08087)
 Cernion (08094)
 Chagny (08095)
 Chalandry-Elaire (08096)
 Champigneul-sur-Vence (08099)
 Champlin (08100)
 Charleville-Mézières (08105)
 Charnois (08106)
 Le Châtelet-sur-Sormonne (08110)
 Chilly (08121)
 Chooze (08122)
 Clavy-Warby (08124)
 Cliron (08125)
 Damouzy (08137)
 Deville (08139)
 Dom-le-Mesnil (08140)
 Dommery (08141)
 L'Échelle (08149)
 Estrebay (08154)
 Étalle (08155)
 Éteignières (08156)
 Étrépigny (08158)
 Évigny (08160)
 Fagnon (08162)
 Fépin (08166)
 La Férée (08167)
 Flaignes-Havys (08169)
 Fligny (08172)
 Flize (08173)
 Foisches (08175)
 La Francheville (08180)
 Le Fréty (08182)
 Fromelennes (08183)
 Fumay (08185)
 Gernelle (08187)
 Gespunsart (08188)
 Girondelle (08189)
 Givet (08190)
 La Grandville (08199)
 Gruyères (08201)
 Gué-d'Hossus (08202)
 Guignicourt-sur-Vence (08203)
 Ham-les-Moines (08206)
 Ham-sur-Meuse (08207)
 Hannappes (08208)
 Hannogne-Saint-Martin (08209)
 Harcy (08212)
 Hargnies (08214)
 Haudrecy (08216)
 Haulmé (08217)
 Les Hautes-Rivières (08218)
 Haybes (08222)
 Hierges (08226)
 La Horgne (08228)
 Houldizy (08230)
 Issancourt-et-Rumel (08235)
 Jandun (08236)
 Joigny-sur-Meuse (08237)
 Laifour (08242)
 Lalobbe (08243)
 Landrichamps (08247)
 Launois-sur-Vence (08248)
 Laval-Morency (08249)
 Lépron-les-Vallées (08251)
 Liart (08254)
 Logny-Bogny (08257)
 Lonny (08260)
 Lumes (08263)
 Maranwez (08272)
 Marby (08273)
 Marlemont (08277)
 Maubert-Fontaine (08282)
 Mazerny (08283)
 Les Mazures (08284)
 Mondigny (08295)
 Montcornet (08297)
 Montcy-Notre-Dame (08298)
 Monthermé (08302)
 Montigny-sur-Meuse (08304)
 Montigny-sur-Vence (08305)
 Murtin-et-Bogny (08312)
 Neufmaison (08315)
 Neufmanil (08316)
 La Neuville-aux-Joûtes (08318)
 Neuville-lès-This (08322)
 Neuville-lez-Beaulieu (08319)
 Nouvion-sur-Meuse (08327)
 Nouzonville (08328)
 Omicourt (08334)
 Omont (08335)
 Poix-Terron (08341)
 Prez (08344)
 Prix-lès-Mézières (08346)
 Raillicourt (08352)
 Rancennes (08353)
 Regniowez (08355)
 Remilly-les-Pothées (08358)
 Renwez (08361)
 Revin (08363)
 Rimogne (08365)
 Rocroi (08367)
 Rouvroy-sur-Audry (08370)
 Rumigny (08373)
 Saint-Laurent (08385)
 Saint-Marceau (08388)
 Saint-Marcel (08389)
 Saint-Pierre-sur-Vence (08395)
 Sapogne-et-Feuchères (08400)
 Sécheval (08408)
 Sévigny-la-Forêt (08417)
 Signy-l'Abbaye (08419)
 Signy-le-Petit (08420)
 Singly (08422)
 Sormonne (08429)
 Sury (08432)
 Taillette (08436)
 Tarzy (08440)
 Thilay (08448)
 Thin-le-Moutier (08449)
 This (08450)
 Touligny (08454)
 Tournavaux (08456)
 Tournes (08457)
 Tremblois-lès-Rocroi (08460)
 Vaux-Villaine (08468)
 Vendresse (08469)
 Villers-le-Tilleul (08478)
 Villers-Semeuse (08480)
 Villers-sur-le-Mont (08482)
 Ville-sur-Lumes (08483)
 Vireux-Molhain (08486)
 Vireux-Wallerand (08487)
 Vivier-au-Court (08488)
 Vrigne-Meuse (08492)
 Warcq (08497)
 Warnécourt (08498)
 Yvernaumont (08503)

History

The arrondissement of Charleville-Mézières (before 1966: Mézières) was created in 1800.

As a result of the reorganisation of the cantons of France which came into effect in 2015, the borders of the cantons are no longer related to the borders of the arrondissements. The cantons of the arrondissement of Charleville-Mézières were, as of January 2015:

 Charleville-Centre
 Charleville-La Houillère
 Flize
 Fumay
 Givet
 Mézières-Centre-Ouest
 Mézières-Est
 Monthermé
 Nouzonville
 Omont
 Renwez
 Revin
 Rocroi
 Rumigny
 Signy-l'Abbaye
 Signy-le-Petit
 Villers-Semeuse

References

Charleville-Mezieres